Camras is a surname. Notable people with the surname include:

Marvin Camras (1916–1995), American electrical engineer and inventor
Carl B. Camras (1953–2009), American ophthalmologist